Very-long-chain enoyl-CoA reductase (TSC13 (gene name), CER10 (gene)) is an enzyme with systematic name very-long-chain acyl-CoA:NADP+ oxidoreductase. This enzyme catalyses the following chemical reaction

 a very-long-chain acyl-CoA + NADP+  a very-long-chain trans-2,3-dehydroacyl-CoA + NADPH + H+

This is the fourth component of the elongase, a microsomal protein complex responsible for extending palmitoyl-CoA and stearoyl-CoA.

References

External links 
 

EC 1.3.1